Thomas Ross DiLuglio (born November 25, 1931) was the Lieutenant Governor of the U.S. State of Rhode Island from 1977 to 1985. He is a Democrat. DiLugio graduated from Classical High School and attended Brown University, where he was a notable track and field athlete who competed in the high jump, broad jump, javelin, discus, shot put, hurdles, and relay races. He is a member of the Brown University Athletic Hall of Fame (inducted 2004). He later attended the Boston University School of Law and earned a law degree. DiLuglio was a frequent guest on the WSBE-TV political roundtable television show, A Lively Experiment, often comedically sparring with Providence Journal columnist M. Charles Bakst. He wrote a collection of short stories, From Scratch, published in 2003.

References

Brown University alumni
Boston University School of Law alumni
Rhode Island Democrats
Lieutenant Governors of Rhode Island
1931 births
Living people